The Hyundai Santro is a city car produced by the South Korean manufacturer Hyundai between 1998 and 2014. The nameplate was revived in 2018 to replace the Eon, and was produced until 2022. The "Santro" nameplate was applied during its first generation to the Atos Prime model, while the second generation is a standalone model.

Hyundai derived the name Santro for the Indian market from Saint-Tropez, a French city famous for fashion, because the company wanted to project it as a ‘fashionable’ car.



First generation (MX; 1998) 

The first generation Santro was introduced in 1998 and went on sale in early 1999. It was also sold in Europe as the Atos Prime and in South Korea and Indonesia as the Kia Visto. It was also known as the Santro Zip in India from 1998 to 2006.

Before the Kia Visto was replaced by the Kia Picanto in 2004, the facelifted Santro was launched in 2003. It was known as the Santro Xing in India from 2003 to 2014.

Second generation (AH2; 2018) 

The second generation Santro was launched on 23 October 2018 in India. This marks the return of the Santro nameplate in India after four years since the last generation was discontinued and nearly twenty-five years since the start of production. It is positioned below the Hyundai i10.
 
The model is powered by a 1.1-litre Epsilon G4HG petrol which produces  at 5,500 rpm and  torque at 4,500 rpm. A bi-fuel version of the engine that uses both petrol and CNG is also available. Transmission options consist of a 5-speed manual and a 5-speed automated manual.

It is one of the Top 3 Urban World Cars of 2019.

Safety 
The Indian version of the Santro with driver airbag scored 2 stars for adult and child occupant protection in the Global NCAP's frontal offset crash tests under its Safer Cars for India project in 2019 (similar to Latin NCAP 2013).

References

External links 
Official website (Hyundai India)

2000s cars
2010s cars
Cars introduced in 1997
City cars
Front-wheel-drive vehicles
Hatchbacks
Santro
Santro
Global NCAP superminis